John Patrick Maloney (30 May 1932 – September 2004) was a British boxer. He competed in the men's welterweight event at the 1952 Summer Olympics and fought as Johnny Maloney.

Maloney won the 1951 and 1952 Amateur Boxing Association British welterweight title, when boxing out of the Dagenham ABC and Royal Air Force respectively.

References

External links
 

1932 births
2004 deaths
British male boxers
Olympic boxers of Great Britain
Boxers at the 1952 Summer Olympics
Place of birth missing
Welterweight boxers